Oswaldo Vigas (August 4, 1926 – April 22, 2014) was a Venezuelan artist, best known as a self-taught painter and muralist. His work includes painting, sculptures, prints, drawings, ceramics and tapestries. He worked in France and Venezuela. He had over one hundred solo exhibitions and is represented in numerous public institutions and private collections around the world.

Early life and education 

Oswaldo Vigas was born in Valencia, Carabobo, Venezuela on August 4, 1926. He identified as mestizo, a term for a person of mixed indigenous and Spanish heritage. He started painting the human body at the age of 12, when his father died.

He went to college and studied medicine at the University of the Andes (Venezuela) (Universidad de los Andes) and at the Universidad Central de Venezuela in Caracas, hoping to be a pediatrician. He received a degree in 1951. While studying, he took several art classes at the Taller Libre de Artes and attended the Escuela de Artes Plásticas Cristóbal Rojas, where he became acquainted with painters like Manuel Cabré and Pedro Ángel González, among others.

His early paintings focused on the human figure, mostly the female form, and a theme that would remain a constant throughout his career: witches (brujas). He became interested in pre-Columbian culture and pottery, specifically Venus de Tacarigua figurines.

His witch series of paintings resulted in three important art prizes in Venezuela, despite controversy. In 1952 he received the National Visual Arts Award for his painting La gran bruja (1951) and had a major solo exhibition at the Museo de Bellas Artes (Museum of Fine Arts) in Caracas. One of these prizes granted him a plane ticket to Paris, where he relocated the same year, in 1952.

Work

Paris 
When Vigas arrived in Paris, he studied at the École des Beaux-Arts and took open courses at the Sorbonne. While in Paris, he was commissioned to produce five mosaic murals that were to become part of the Universidad Central de Venezuela, later declared a World Heritage Cultural Site by UNESCO in 2000.

During most of the 1950s, his works shifted away from the human figure and towards constructivism and abstraction. In 1953, he participated in the São Paulo Biennial and in a group show at the Musée d’Art Moderne de la Ville de Paris, among other exhibitions. Between 1953 and 1958, the artist exhibited regularly in France and Venezuela. In 1954, he represented Venezuela at the XXVII Venice Biennale, and was part of the Painters of Venezuela traveling exhibition at the Pan-American Union, sponsored by the Smithsonian Institution.

During the late 1950s to mid 1960s, while still living in France, Vigas was invited to participate in an important survey about Latin American art in which he was awarded first prize: the Gulf-Caribbean Art Exhibition, curated by Lee Malone at The Museum of Fine Arts, Houston. He also had exhibitions at the Slater Memorial Museum of Norwich, Connecticut and the University of Nebraska Art Gallery, and participated in the Contemporary Drawings from Latin America show at the Pan-American Union in Washington, D.C. He was included in another large survey exhibition, South American Art Today, curated by José Gómez Sicre at the Dallas Museum of Fine Art.

Influenced by a visit to Picasso in 1955 and by an interest in anthropology and so-called "primitive cultures", Vigas channeled his works of the 1950s into a search for an authentic language, combining gestural, geometric and figurative paintings. This led him to progressively explore connections with early cultures and the notion of a personal identity marked by telluric, magical and personal imaginative resources, which can be found in his works from the 1960s onward.

He lived in Paris for twelve years where he met his wife Janine and was associated with Fernand Léger, Max Ernst, and Wifredo Lam. In 1964, he moved back to Valencia, Venezuela and continued to exhibit his work thoroughly throughout the country. In 1967, his son Lorenzo was born, and in 1970, he relocated to Caracas.

Venezuela 
The 1960s marked the artist's informalist period; his thick black lines dissolved the figure into abstract volumes and shapes. Soon after his arrival in Venezuela, he was named Cultural Director of the Universidad de Los Andes. He simultaneously accepted an appointment as Artistic Director of the Instituto Nacional de Cultura y Bellas Artes (INCIBA), promoting the work of artists and exhibitions, as well as contributing to the creation of national Salons and awards to help artists from around the country. He remained in office until 1972.
 
From the mid 60's onwards, Vigas work progressively shifted back from informalism to a new figurative phase. During the 1980s, Vigas produced a series of tapestries and ceramic works, and his first bronze-cast sculptures.
 
In 1990, the Museo de Arte Contemporáneo de Caracas Sofía Imber organized a major retrospective of his works, showcasing not only paintings and sculptures but also tapestries, ceramics and jewelry. Lagoven, the oil company and subsidiary of PDVSA, produced a documentary film about his work.

In 1992 the city of Monte Carlo honored him with the Prince Rainier Grand Prize, and the Monnaie de Paris organized a retrospective from 1952 to 1993 showcasing one hundred and thirty-two works comprising paintings, ceramics and sculptures.

During his later years, Vigas continued to work and exhibit worldwide, gaining further international recognition. In 2012 he was invited to participate in the Un Coeur, un Monde group show that traveled through France, the United States, Vietnam, Australia, Brazil and Japan. He was also invited to exhibit at The Latin American & Caribbean Contemporary Art Today survey at the Miura Museum of Art, Tokyo, Japan.

In 2008, he was designated Commandeur de l’Ordre des Arts et des Lettres de France.

Death and legacy 
Vigas died on 22 April 2014 in Caracas, at the age of 87. His wife Janine Vigas and his son Lorenzo (director, screenwriter and film producer) outlived him.

The Oswaldo Vigas Foundation (Fundación Oswaldo Vigas) was created to continue to expand his art legacy worldwide. A major anthological exhibition travelled throughout the Americas to Peru, Chile, and Colombia, titled Oswaldo Vigas Anthological 1943-2013.

His son, the filmmaker Lorenzo Vigas, with his first feature film From Afar, won the Golden Lion for best film of the 2015 Venice Film Festival.

Controversy 
Vigas' work featured a clear influence from indigenous art of South America and Venus de Tacarigua figurines, it has been questioned if this work is a body of abstraction or a rather cultural appropriation. This issue is similar to Picasso's African Period and the use of African masks in his work.

Awards and honors 
Vigas received a Doctor Honoris Causa degree from the Universidad de Los Andes in 1999, and from the Universidad Gran Mariscal de Ayacucho (UGMA), in Barcelona, Venezuela.

Vigas received the International Association of Art Critics Award twice, in 2008 and 2014; in 2004, he was the recipient of the Latin Union Award in Washington, DC.

Exhibitions

Solo exhibitions 
A major anthological exhibition of Vigas' work traveled throughout the Americas. The first installment of Oswaldo Vigas Anthological: 1943- 2013 was held at the Museum of Contemporary Art in Lima, Peru; the show then traveled to the National Museum of Fine Arts in Santiago, Chile, and it will open in Bogotá, Colombia in July 2015.

This is a listing of select exhibitions of Vigas.

Group exhibitions

Publications

References

1926 births
2014 deaths
Venezuelan painters
Muralists
People from Valencia, Venezuela
20th-century Venezuelan physicians
École des Beaux-Arts alumni
University of the Andes (Venezuela) alumni
Venezuelan contemporary artists